The following is a list of dishes in Maltese cuisine:

Appetizers
 Żebbuġ Mimli (pitted green olives stuffed with tuna mixture)
 Fażola bajda bit-tewm u t-tursin (White beans with parsley, garlic and olive oil)
 Ful bit-tewm
 Bigilla (mashed "Tic beans "known in Malta as "Ful Ta' Ġirba" (Djerba beans))
 Galletti (Maltese biscuit)
 Bebbux (escargot)

Soups

 Brodu (beef or chicken broth)
 Minestra (Maltese version of minestrone, a thick soup of Italian origin made with vegetables)
 Kusksu (vegetable soup with small pasta beads called kusksu and fresh broad beans in season)
 Soppa tal-armla Widow's Soup (vegetable soup with fresh cheeselets and beaten eggs)
 Aljotta (fish soup with plenty of garlic, herbs, and tomatoes)
 Kawlata (cabbage and pork soup)

Pasta and rice

 Imqarrun (macaroni, Bolognese-style meat sauce, and egg casserole)
 Timpana (macaroni and tomato sauce casserole)
 Ravjul (ravioli and tomato sauce)
 Ross il-forn (baked rice)
 Għaġin grieg (small pasta beads with minced pork and cheese)
 Froġa tat-tarja (fried omelette with vermicelli pasta)

Meat
 Stuffat tal-fenek (rabbit stew)
 Fenek moqli (fried rabbit)
 Braġjoli (thin slices of meat that are stuffed and rolled as a roulade)
 Laħam fuq il-fwar (steamed slices of beef)
 Falda Mimlija (stuffed flank of pork)
 Laħam taż-żiemel (stallion meat, usually fried or baked in a white wine sauce)
 Zalzett tal-Malti (a short, thick sausage made of pork, sea salt, black peppercorns, coriander seeds and parsley)
 Mazzit (Maltese blood sausage)

Fish

 Lampuka
 Stuffat tal-qarnit (octopus stew)
 Qarnit bit-tewm (octopus with garlic)
 Klamari mimlija (stuffed Calamari)
 Pixxispad (fried swordfish)

Eggs and cheeses
 Ġbejna (a small round cheese)
 Froġa (omelette with ġbejna, broad beans or meat)
 Balbuljata (scrambled eggs cooked with tomatoes and onions)

Vegetables and sauces

 Qarabagħli mimli (stuffed courgette)
 Brunġiel mimli (stuffed aubergine)
 Bżar mimli (stuffed peppers)
 Patata l-forn (baked sliced potatoes)
 Kapunata
 Aljoli (arjoli) (Maltese aioli which contains no egg)
 Qaqocc Mimli (stuffed artichokes)

Savoury pastries

 Torta tal-irkotta (ricotta pie)
 Sfineġ (vegetable, fish or cheese fritters);
 Pastizzi
 Qassatat (qassata)
 Torti tar-ross u l-qargħa ħamra (rice and pumpkin pie)

Bread

 Ħobża tal-Malti
 Ftira (a Maltese flatbread)
 Ħobż biż-żejt u t-tadam (bread with olive oil and tomato)
 Ftira Għawdxija
 Qagħaq tal-Appostli

Sweets

 Qagħaq tal-ħmira (soft sweet bagel shape cake with a hint of aniseed, topped with sesame seeds)
 Imqaret (deep fried diamond-shaped pastry)
 Kannoli tal-irkotta (ricotta filled fried crisp pastry tubes) 
 Ravjul moqli (sweet toasted ravioli)
 Torti tat-tamal (date and cocoa tart)
 Torti tal-marmorat (almond and chocolate pie)
 Ħelwa tat-Tork (nut studded sesame seed and sugar halva)  
 Pudina tal-ħobż (baked bread pudding with raisins and cocoa powder)
 Prinjolata (Carnival sweet, made of biscuit and sponge cake covered with frosting and decorated with glacè cherries and melted chocolate)
 Kwareżimal (Lenten almond biscuit scented with the zest of orange, lemon and Maltese mixed spice, cinnamon and orange blossom)
 Ftira tar-Randan (Lenten honey drizzled squares of crisp deep fried pastry)
 Karamelli tal-ħarrub (Lenten hard candy flavoured with carob)
 Figolla (Easter icing-coated biscuit stuffed with a mixture of sweet ground almonds called intrita)
 Ħobża ta' San Martin (sweet bread roll, sweetened with mastic associated with Saint Martin's Day)
 Qagħaq tal-għasel or tal-Qastanija (Christmas sweet rings made from a light pastry with a filling made of treacle, honey, semolina, citrus zest, cinnamon and cloves)
 Għadam tal-mejtin (Pastry shaped in the form of a bone filled with almond paste)
 Zeppoli

Beverages
 Ġulepp tal-ħarrub (Carob Syrup)
 Imbuljuta (Chestnut, Tangerine zest and Cocoa Drink)
 Kafè (coffee boiled with aniseed, cinnamon sticks and/or rosewater)
 Ruġġata (a drink made from cinnamon, vanilla, bitter almonds, sugar, water and milk similar to Italian 'orzata')
 Te fit-Tazza (A local variety of Builder's Tea, traditionally served with condensed milk and sweetened in a glass)
 Kinnie (A bittersweet soft drink)
 Bajtra (a prickly pear-based liqueur)

References

External links

 

Lists of foods by nationality
Dishes